In organic chemistry, a triketone or trione is an organic compound containing three ketone groups.  The simplest triketones, such as cyclopropanetrione and 2,3,4-pentanetrione, are only of occasional theoretical interest.  More pertinent are triacetylmethane and 2,4,6-heptanetrione.  Both species exist predominantly in the enol forms.

Occurrence and significance
Tri- and polyketones are of practical importance as intermediates in the biosynthesis of polyketides.  These natural products are a major source of antibiotics.

See also
 Diketone

References

External links